The Flame Within is a 1935 American drama film written and directed by Edmund Goulding. The film stars Ann Harding, Herbert Marshall, Maureen O'Sullivan, Louis Hayward, Henry Stephenson and Margaret Seddon. The film was released on May 17, 1935, by Metro-Goldwyn-Mayer.

Plot
A suicidal woman, Lillian Belton (Maureen O'Sullivan), unsuccessfully attempts suicide by taking pills, and she is referred to a psychiatrist for therapy. While at the psychiatrist, Lillian attempts suicide again by trying to jump out the window, and she is only stopped by the psychiatrist, Dr. Mary White (Ann Harding). Dr. White learns that Lillian’s troubles are connected to Jack Kerry, (Louis Hayward) who she contacted just prior to her attempt with the psychiatrist. Lillian loves Jack, but he is an alcoholic and does not love Lillian the way she loves him. Dr. White contacts Jack, and persuades him to seek treatment for his alcoholism. As Jack completes his treatment, he falls in love with Dr. White, but the Dr. reminds Jack of Lillian’s need for him, and Jack and Lillian marry. Lillian’s physician, Dr. Gordon Phillips (Herbert Marshall), is also in love with Dr. White, but cannot convince her to leave her patients and her practice. Dr. White encounters Lillian and Jack at a costume ball, and Jack manages to get a dance with Dr. White, as a suspicious Lillian looks on. Jack confesses his love for Dr. White, but she again reminds him of his marriage and commitment to Lillian. An enraged Lillian creates a scene with Dr. White, who uses this experience as a parallel of her and Dr. Phillips’ relationship.

Cast
Ann Harding as Dr. Mary White
Herbert Marshall as Dr. Gordon Phillips
Maureen O'Sullivan as Linda Belton
Louis Hayward as Jack Kerry
Henry Stephenson as Dr. Jock Frazier
Margaret Seddon as Mrs. Ida Grenfell
George Hassell as Mr. Rigby
Eily Malyon as Murdock
Isabelle Keith as Nurse Carter

References

External links 
 

1935 films
1930s English-language films
American drama films
1935 drama films
Metro-Goldwyn-Mayer films
Films directed by Edmund Goulding
American black-and-white films
1930s American films